The Corrs: Live at Lansdowne Road is the second video album by Irish band the Corrs, released on DVD on 29 October 2000. Filmed on 17 July 1999 on the final date of the Talk on Corners World Tour, the Lansdowne Road concert was a homecoming for the band in front of a home crowd of 45,000 people and would be the biggest part of their career after two platinum-selling albums Forgiven, Not Forgotten and Talk on Corners, several hit singles ("Runaway", "What Can I Do?", "Dreams" and "So Young"), and two world tours.

Track listing
 Intro
 "Only When I Sleep"
 "The Right Time
 "Joy of Life"
 "Forgiven, Not Forgotten"
 "What Can I Do?"
 "No Frontiers"
 "Runaway"
 "Haste to the Wedding"
 "Secret Life"
 "Love to Love You"
 "Queen of Hollywood"
 Dreams Intro
 "Dreams"
 "I Never Loved You Anyway"
 "Lough Erin Shore"
 "Closer"
 "So Young"
 "Toss the Feathers"
 Credits

Special features
4:3 full frame
16:9 wide screen
DVD 9
English
Region 2
Dolby Digital 5.1 Surround English/Linear PCM Stereo English/Dolby Digital 2.0 Stereo English
Dolby Digital 5.1 Surround
PCM Stereo
Dolby Digital Stereo
English/French/German/Italian/Spanish

Plus
The Corrs Live at the Fleadh Music Festival
The Corrs In Blue documentary
The Corrs "Breathless" official music video

Certifications

References

The Corrs albums
2000 video albums